Jerry Newton was the older brother of Wayne Newton. He and Wayne performed as the Rascals in Rhythm in Las Vegas as children, as well as later on The Jackie Gleason Show and Ozark Jubilee. In the 1966 Bonanza episode "Unwritten Commandment" he was the Silver Dollar Saloon's piano playing Mike, along with Wayne who played ranch hand/singer Andy. In the 1970s, he owned WBGY, an FM radio station in Tullahoma, Tennessee.

Career

1950s
Along with brother Wayne, he began his career at Hillbilly Park, an outdoor music venue. They became known as the Newton Rascals.
In 1957 with Jerry at 15 and his brother Wayne 12, they were  signed with ABC-Paramount. That year as Jerry & Wayne, they had a single "Baby, Baby, Baby" b/w "I'm Sad, Blue And Lonesome" released on ABC-Paramount.<ref name=country>Rockin''' Country Style - Jerry & Wayne, Original Releases</ref>

In 1959, as The Newton Brothers Featuring Wayne Newton, they had "The Real Thing" b/w "I Spy" released on Capitol. They started in 1952–3 in Phoenix Az on the Lew King ranger show.

1960s to 1970s
In 1961, they had "The Little White Cloud That Cried" b/w "Calorie Date" released on the George label. Later that year, the Newton Brothers had "Little Jukebox" b/w "Wild Irish Rose" also on the George label. The following year they had another George release with "You're Much Too Lovely To Cry" b/w  I Still Love You.

In 1963, Jerry Newton with his own lounge act was appearing at the Fremont Hotel in Las Vegas, Nevada.

In 1966, he had a part as Mike in The Unwritten Commandment, an episode of Bonanza, which aired on April 10. His brother Wayne also appeared in the same episode. He also appeared in the series another time in an unaccredited role as Mike the piano player in A Christmas Story.

In 1970, he was playing guitar, backing his brother at the Frontier Hotel, and Jerry just about stole the show. Billboard reviewer Laura Deni noted his moving rendition of "Danny Boy"  with his reciting of a letter to a mother from her dead soldier son. In 1972, Billboard'' mentioned in its LAS VEGAS section that he was leaving his brother's act and was going to live on a ranch in Arizona.

In 1975, along with co-buyers, Jerry Newton purchased radio station WJIG from Edwin P. Jordan.

1980s
In March 1982, a club he and George Wagner were partners in had opened in Tullahoma. The club, Cowboy's, a 19,000-square-foot dance theatre nightclub had a seating capacity for 1,250. They enlisted Billy Smith of One Niters, Inc. to act as their house agent for booking major acts.
In 1984, he had two petitions which were filed in the U.S. Bankruptcy Court. One was for QUIN-ABI Broadcasting Inc., which owned radio station WBGY, and the other was Cowboy's Nightclub of Tullahoma Inc.

Death
Newton died at the age of 75 at the St. Rose Dominican Hospital, Siena Campus, in Las Vegas.

References

2016 deaths
American male guitarists
American male television actors
Year of birth uncertain